Tech:NYC, founded in 2016, is a New York City-based non profit organization. It represents New York City’s technology industry with government, civic institutions, in business, and in the media. Its primary goals are to attract tech talent to the city and to advocate for policies that will help tech companies grow.

History
Founded in May 2016 by venture capitalist Fred Wilson, Oath CEO Tim Armstrong, and former Engine executive director Julie Samuels, Tech:NYC is a non-profit organization. The founding companies were AOL, Bloomberg L.P., Facebook, Google and Union Square Ventures. As of 2018, Tech:NYC had grown to more than 600 member companies. Samuels serves as executive director of Tech:NYC.

Advocacy
Tech:NYC's mission is to advocate for a tech-friendly regulatory environment at both the city and state levels.

U.S. Immigration Policy 
Tech:NYC has advocated for a continuation of previous immigration policies at a time when government leaders favor more restrictions on who is allowed to work in the United States. The organization also launched a campaign called Tech Takes Action in September 2017 to rally support for immigrants who qualified for Deferred Action for Childhood Arrivals.

Net neutrality
When the FCC announced plans to roll back net neutrality protections that were implemented in 2015, Tech:NYC advocated against the move, calling for continuation of current practices. Additionally, it worked with Senator Chuck Schumer to support a Congressional Review Act in the U.S. Senate to restore net neutrality protections.

Autonomous vehicles
As New York State decided whether to fund testing for self-driving cars, Tech:NYC supported continued autonomous vehicle testing throughout the state.

References

External links
 Official website 

Organizations established in 2016
Non-profit organizations based in New York City
Lobbying organizations in the United States